Miao Xiyong (1546–1627), courtesy name Zhongchun, was a Chinese physician active during the Ming dynasty. Reportedly a self-taught physician, many of his prescriptions were collected in a compendium titled Notes from the Studio of Early Enlightenment. Miao also authored a commentary on the Shennong bencao jing.

Career
Born to an affluent family in Changshu, Miao did not sit for any imperial examinations and purportedly began learning medicine on his own from the age of seventeen. Unlike his fellow physicians, who usually worked in a shop and dispensed their own prescriptions, Miao was a wandering physician who did not carry any medicine with him. He would not hesitate to travel to distant locations on horseback. Most of his clients tended to be in the upper-class and could readily access the expensive ingredients that Miao would prescribe by hand. One of Miao's patients had to endure a year-long regimen of abdominal pain medication, or a total of six hundred doses, before he was cured. 

Miao was known for his preference for "cold and cooling drugs", such as the gypsum that he used to cure a pregnant woman of her fever. However, he also prescribed "warm-natured" drugs on occasion. For instance, he made a patient consume large amounts of ginseng to alleviate his belching.

Miao spent most of his final years in the county of Jintan, where he remained active as a literatus and physician. However, after many of his academic friends were persecuted or purged by court eunuch Wei Zhongxian, due to a dispute over governmental policy, Miao retreated to his hometown. His treatise on the Shennong bencao jing, titled Shénnóng Běncǎo Jīng Shū or Exegesis of the Divine Farmer Classic of Materia Medica, was published in 1625, with the assistance of a distant relative named Mao Fengbao (1599–1659). At some point, Miao returned to Jintan and died there in 1627.

Writings
In 1611,  (1560–1625), a former official and Miao's friend of thirty years, began compiling a collection of "efficacious medical recipes" that Miao had prescribed. Among the prescriptions discussed in the Xianxingzhai biji or Notes from the Studio of Early Enlightenment is a decoction containing a virgin boy's urine mixed with various herbs that Miao had used to treat Ding himself in 1615, when he suffered a minor stroke. 

A revised edition, titled Xianxingzhai guangbiji or Expanded Notes from the Studio of Early Enlightenment, lists Miao as the primary author and contains his commentary alongside Ding's original notes. It was first published in 1622, in response to the overwhelming demand for the earlier Xianxingzhi biji that had ostensibly gone out of stock by 1621. A further revised edition of the text (and the only extant version today) was published by one of Miao's earliest students, in 1642.

Appearance
Miao was an "eccentric gentleman" who had "electrifying eyes and protruding whiskers". According to his contemporary Qian Qianyi:

References

Citations

Cited works

 
 

1546 births
1627 deaths
Chinese non-fiction writers
Ming dynasty writers